WRHJ-LP (93.1 FM) is a low-power radio station broadcasting a conservative religious format. Licensed to Rock Hill, South Carolina, United States, the station is currently owned by Southside Baptist Church and features programming from the Fundamental Broadcasting Network.

References

External links
 
 

RHJ-LP
Rock Hill, South Carolina
RJH-LP
Baptist Christianity in South Carolina